The Canadian Ski Instructors' Alliance (CSIA), founded in 1938, is an association of more than twenty thousand professional skiers located across Canada. The CSIA's purposes are to ensure a nationwide ski teaching standard through the development of effective skiing techniques and teaching methods and promote the importance of ski safety. The organization grants four general levels of certification, as well as several module certifications, such as snow park instruction, mogul skiing, and super giant slalom skiing. Each successive level demonstrates competence in ski instruction, pedagogy, as well as individual ski performance. As such, the highest level (four) is difficult to attain. In 2021-2022 ski season, less than 50 new Level 4's were certified according to the organization's official Facebook page. Lately, the CSIA came up with a merit certification for ski instructors that were part of the organization for twenty-five or more consecutive years. The celebrated members are normally awarded a "25-year member" pin, as well as a certificate, recognizing their efforts in the field.

History
The CSIA was founded in 1938.

Today, the CSIA is divided into a set of regional chapters, each of which covers at least one Canadian province.

The national office is the centralization point of all activities. Main responsibilities include communications, as well as programs and educational development.

In 2013, a major change has taken place within the CSIA organization in order to manage certifications. Members are since then required to accumulate "education credits" in order to be eligible to obtain higher certification levels. Notably, Level 2 certification requires 10 education credits, while Level 3 certification requires a total of 40 education credits. In general, participation in a one-day national education program will provide approximately 10 education credits, as will certification from a member organization, such as the Canadian Ski Coaches Federation and the Canadian Association of Snowboard Instructors, among others.

Certifications

The CSIA has a total of four certification levels for instructors, as well as an additional, optional snow park certification course. The first level of certification, Level 1, is accessible to any intermediate-level skiers who are at least 14 years of age. It can usually be obtained after a 3-day certification course. Each region in Canada has a coordinator who organizes Level 1 courses within their specific regions. Nevertheless, candidates may pursue their certifications within other regions. For example, a skier from the Quebec region may follow his or her instructor training and obtain certification in New Brunswick, which is part of the Atlantic region.
The snow park certification was designed for skiers and instructors with park experience who are interested in teaching others in snow park. This certification can be recognized as 10 education credits for instructors to advance to their next certification level. Since the pedagogical material seen in the snow park certification course is similar to that in the Level 1 course, snow park instructors can be admitted to the Level 2 training course without holding a Level 1 certification.

The second level of certification, Level 2, is accessible to all current Level 1 ski instructors who have paid their membership dues to the CSIA, as well as members of provincial partner organizations, such as the PESQ in Quebec or OT3 in Ontario, who wish to pursue their training with the CSIA for national recognition of certification. They must complete a two-day training camp, obtain 10 CSIA education credits, and pass the two-day Level 2 teaching and skiing examinations.

Level 3, is considered a senior certification. Apart from more extensive training and examinations, a total of 40 education credits are needed in order to obtain this certification. Many instructors typically train for several years before attending the certification course.

It is worthy to note that the 10 education credits required to obtain the Level 2 certification, as well as the 40 education credits required for the Level 3 certification, can be accumulated over the years by participating in skiing or teaching professional development programs organized by the CSIA, completing modules addressing a particular skiing or teaching subject (e.g., teaching children), or obtaining an entry-level certification with a partner industry organization, including the Canadian Association of Snowboard Instructors (CASI), the Canadian Ski Coaches Federation (CSCF), the Canadian Association for Disabled Skiing (CADS), the Canadian Association of Nordic Ski Instructors (CANSI), the Canadian Ski Guide Association (CSGA), or the Canadian Freestyle Ski Association (CFSA). Instructors who are members of multiple partner organizations can only obtain the 10 education credits once as the offer is non-cumulative.

This fourth and final level of certification, Level 4, can only be delivered by senior course conductors and evaluators, who themselves hold a Level 4 certification.

Training and certification programs are also available for senior instructors (Levels 3 & 4) who wish to partake in the delivery of CSIA certification courses as course conductors and evaluators.

Membership

Regular member
Most ski instructors are regular members of the CSIA. They may work in any ski resort across Canada, the United States, Australia, and the countries of Europe.

Associate member
Ski instructors holding certifications from other certifying bodies, such as the PESA in Quebec, may apply to become associate members in order to pursue further certification with the CSIA.

25-Year member
The CSIA offers a merit certification for ski instructors' that were part of the organization for twenty-five or more consecutive years. The celebrated members are normally awarded a "25 year member" pin, as well as a certificate, recognizing their efforts in the field.

Affiliate member
Affiliate members are mostly ski instructors who are certified by the International Ski Instructors' Alliance (ISIA).

Governing board
The governing board of the CSIA is made up of seven individuals who represent the regional committees in Canada. Board members are appointed at the beginning of each ski season. In addition to holding certification with the CSIA, members are typically certified ski coaches and may hold snowboard instructorship with the Canadian Association of Snowboard Instructors (CASI).

For the 2022–2023 season, the board members include:
Allison Sharpe (CSIA 3, CSCF 2), Chair and National Representative of Ontario
Jamie Lou Morneau (CSIA 2, ACA Entry Level Trained), Vice-Char and National Representative of Central
Paul Sauvé (CSIA 4, CSCF 2), Treasurer and National Representative of British Columbia
Antoine Tétreault Paquin (CSIA Level 4, ACA Development Level Trained), Secretary and National Representative of Quebec
Colin Borrow (CSIA 4, CSCF 2), National Representative of Alberta
Nathan Reece (CSIA 4, CSCF 1), National Representative of Atlantic
D.Darren MacDonald (CSIA 3, CSCF 2), Past-Chair (non-voting)
Perry Schmunk (CSIA 4), Managing Director (non-voting)

Regional committees
The regional committees of the Canadian Ski Instructors' Alliance are as follows:
The regional committee of British Columbia is made up of eleven members of the CSIA;
The regional committee of the Atlantic region includes representatives from Prince Edward Island, New Brunswick, Newfoundland and Labrador, and Nova Scotia;
The regional committee of Quebec is made up of ten members, who are elected every few years;
The regional committee of Ontario is made up of several ski instructors, including one individual who acts as the main liaison between the CSIA and the Canadian Association of Snowboard Instructors;
The regional committee of the Central region is made up of ski instructors representing Saskatchewan, Manitoba, and Northwestern Ontario;
The regional committee of Alberta includes eight ski instructors.

It is worthy of noting that each regional committee generally includes one Level 1 coordinator and one PDP coordinator, which are responsible for planning and coordinating these events in their respective regions. Upper level certification schedules are handled at a national level by the National Office of the CSIA.

National helmet use policy

Helmets have been shown to reduce the incidence of severe head injuries. Since 2014, the CSIA requires that a helmet be worn by all course conductors on duty as well as those in uniform. Additionally, course participants are required to wear a helmet for the freeride/snowpark and GS modules.

Associated organizations
 Canadian Association of Snowboard Instructors
 Canadian Ski Coaches Federation
 Canadian Adaptive Snowsports
 Ontario Track 3 - Ski Association
 Canadian Association of Nordic Ski Instructors
 International Ski Instructors' Alliance

References

External links
Canadian Ski Instructors' Alliance
Canadian Ski Instructors' Alliance - Quebec
Canadian Ski Instructors' Alliance - Ontario

Skiing organizations
Professional associations based in Canada
Sports professional associations